Captain Boom is a Filipino comic book character who fights crime that was created by Mars Ravelo and illustrated by his son Ric Ravelo. Captain Boom first appeared in United Komiks of PSG Publishing House in 1966. When the character was first introduced in television, his character is renamed to Kapitan Boom. Kapitan is a Tagalog word for "captain."

Character background
Captain Boom is a crime fighter that can fly and run fast. He also have an amplified hearing and able to create a sonic shield and sonic roar. He does not have super strength but upon generating a sonic shield on his fist and hitting a vehicle, it can have a dent without making a damage on his hand.  All of his powers are produced through sonic means. He has the ability of flight due to the creation of sound waves and thus, he cannot fly in space because there is no sound there.

He dons a red suit with a three-star emblem on his chest and a blue cape. His grandmother made his first costume out of a red shirt and pants together with a handkerchief with holes that serves as a mask.

In other media

In 2008, Captain Boom's character was featured on Komiks Presents: Kapitan Boom, a television series that was aired on ABS-CBN. The character was renamed to "Kapitan Boom" and was portrayed by Jon Avila. His alter-ego, Lance Mercado, was played by Jay-R Siaboc.

Collected editions

See also
Isang Lakas
List of Filipino superheroes

External links

Notes
 In the 2008 television series, the terms used are super shield and super boom instead of sonic shield and sonic roar respectively.

References

Philippine comics titles
Filipino superheroes
Comics characters introduced in 1966
1966 comics debuts
Fictional Filipino people
Filipino comics characters